Hinduism is a minor faith in Hong Kong growing with South Asian birth growth. It is practised by descendants of migrants from South Asia who are mainly businessmen. Hinduism is represented by 0.5% of Hong Kong population. There are 40,000 Hindus as of 2010. In 2016, it increased to 1.3% with 100,000 Hindus.

Contemporary Society
Hindu holidays of Holi is celebrated by Hindus as well as non-Hindus, for example, Diwali at Tsim Sha Tsui, where many South Asians in Hong Kong lived and worked in. Many Indian restaurants, particularly the vegetarian ones, are owned by Hindus. There is a Hindu crematorium in Cape Collins. The International Society for Krishna Consciousness has a centre in Hong Kong established in 1981.

Notable Establishments

Happy Valley Temple 
This temple acts as the central nexus for around one hundred thousand Hindus in Hong Kong, and not only performs traditional poojas, weddings and other religious ceremonies, but also acts as a gatekeeper to the Commonwealth War Memorial and operates a crematorium in Cape Collins. The temple is managed by the Hindu Association of Hong Kong.

Located on the hillside behind the Hindu Temple at 1B Wong Nei Chong Road (opposite side from the Happy Valley Racecourse) there exists a Commonwealth War Graves Commission (CWGC) memorial to 8 Hindu and Sikh soldiers whose mortal remains were cremated at the cremation ground behind the Hindu temple. A large white granite obelisk bearing the names of eight Indian soldiers who served in Hong Kong to assist with colonial defence of the Hong Kong garrison during the First World War. As with Commonwealth War Graves Commissions (CWGC) memorials all over the world, the military memorial is open to the general public and access is through the staircase at the rear of the Hindu Temple.

See also
 South Asians in Hong Kong
 Battle of Hong Kong

References

Religion in Hong Kong
Hong Kong